Henry Daffa Shekifu (born 16 June 1946) is a Tanzanian CCM politician and was Member of Parliament for Lushoto constituency from 1995 to 2015 and Regional Commissioner of Mtwara and Manyara from 2005 to 2010.

References

1946 births
Living people
Chama Cha Mapinduzi MPs
Tanzanian MPs 1995–2000
Alliance Secondary School alumni
Tanzanian MPs 2000–2005
Tanzanian MPs 2005–2010
Tanzanian MPs 2010–2015